Little Fyodor is the performance name of Dave Lichtenberg, an underground punk/garage musician from Denver, Colorado, who has been on the scene for two decades. He originally performed in the band Walls of Genius, and then went on to become a solo act (now with a full band, but still carrying the name Little Fyodor). He is also known as a public radio DJ, and a reviewer of self-published music.

Biography 

Little Fyodor is originally from suburban New Jersey where during college he was particularly inspired by the Ramones album Leave Home including the song "Carbona Not Glue". He moved to Colorado in 1981. In the 1980s he was a member of Walls of Genius, a cassette culture band which consisted of Little Fyodor, Evan Cantor, Ed Fowler and Brad Cartin, an experimental group from Colorado which produced 30 tapes from 1982 to 1986. Dave Lichtenberg later went on to work on his solo project Little Fyodor.

Little Fyodor is also notable for his association with the Elephant 6 collective. The Apples in Stereo performed some of their earliest shows opening for his band. "Let it be known that the very first time the Apples ever performed with a real drum set, they were opening for Little Fyodor and Babushka." Returning the favor, Fyodor's record "Dance of the Salted Slug" was released on the Elephant 6 label. In 1993 he toured with Negativland.

Before moving to Denver, Lichtenberg had a show on WTJU, the student-run station at the University of Virginia. Now, as Little Fyodor, he hosts a biweekly radio show every other Saturday at 11 PM on Boulder's KGNU titled "Under the Floorboards", which showcases obscure artists. 2011 marks the 27th anniversary of Little Fyodor’s career as a DJ at KGNU. After an initial interview in 1997, Little Fyodor also began a column based on his radio show, "A Few of the Interesting Characters I've Discovered Under the Floorboards", in Denver-based fringe magazine CyberPsychos AOD.

After a live appearance by Little Fyodor and Babushka at the Death Equinox '97 convention, attendees were so enthusiastic about the performance that they requested having them play every year.  Little Fyodor became the con's Audial Terror Guest of Honor in '98 as a result, and they continued to play every year.  Rev. Ivan Stang of the Church of the SubGenius witnessed their '98 performance and asked them to play at the next X-Day gathering.

Denver group Von Hemmling was reportedly named by Fyodor.

As of June 2015 the group is still performing.

Discography

Little Fyodor (and Babushka) releases 
 Peace is Boring - 2009, Public Eyesore
 Boyd Rice Presents:The Very Best Of Little Fyodor's Greatest Hits! - 2005, Discriminate Audio
 Babushka's Naughty XXXmas! (with Little Fyodor & The Inactivists) - 2005
 Live @ XX-Day (with Babushka) - 2004
 Revolution 9 - 2000
 Dance Of The Salted Slug -1994, Elephant 6 Recording Co
 Idiots Are Closer To God - 1990
 Beneath The Uber-Putz - 1988
 Slither / Sloth - 1985/1986

Appearances/Contributions 

 Madness Lives: The Walls Of Genius Compilation - 2005
 Raw Sewage, VOL. II - 2004
 Before... and After - 2004
 Ludovico Treatment - Music To Cure Your Ills - 2003
 Raw Sewage, VOL. I - 2002
 Crazed To The Core - 2001
 The Way I Feel (with Boyd Rice & Winona Righteous) - 2000

TV appearances and radio broadcasts 

 The Dr. Demento Show #86-14 - April 6, 1986
 The Dr. Demento Show #97-46 - November 16, 1997
 Setlist TV - 1 hour Staten Island Cable TV special featuring Little Fyodor and Babushka - January 2011
 Outsight Radio Hours #719 - September 15, 2013

Reviews
http://aural-innovations.com/2004/january/fyodor02.html - Walls Of Genius - "Raw Sewage, Vol. I" (self-released 2003, originally released on cassette 1983-1984) 
Walls Of Genius - "Ludovico Treatment: Music To Cure Your Ills" (self-released 2003, originally released on cassette 1984) 
Little Fyodor - "Idiots Are Closer To God" (self-released 2001, originally released on LP 1990)

http://www.aural-innovations.com/issues/issue22/fyodor01.html - Walls Of Genius - "Crazed To The Core" (self-released on CDR in 2001, originally released 1984 on cassette, WOG 0017) 
Little Fyodor - "Dance Of The Salted Slug" (The Elephant 6 Recording Co. 1994, EL6-901)

http://www.aural-innovations.com/issues/issue30/fyodor03.html - Walls Of Genius - "Raw Sewage, Vol. II" (self-released 2004, originally released various cassettes, 1983–1985) 
Walls Of Genius - "Before …and After" (self-released 2004, originally released on cassette, 1984) 
Little Fyodor - "Beneath The Uber-Putz" (self-released 2002, originally released on LP, 1988, Small Tools Tradition)

http://www.westword.com/2009-09-03/music/little-fyodor - Little Fyodor - "Peace is Boring" Review from Westword, September 2009

References

External links
Little Fyodor's home page
Under the Floorboards schedule on KGNU
interview, The Gri:n Files #1, May 31, 2001.
Discriminate Audio label site
Westword comic strip interview, September 24, 2009
Walls Of Genius archive site

The Elephant 6 Recording Company artists
Living people
Musicians from Denver
University of Virginia alumni
Year of birth missing (living people)
Radio personalities from Virginia
Radio personalities from Colorado
Cassette culture 1970s–1990s